Teenage Mutant Ninja Turtles & Other Strangeness is a role-playing game based on the comic book created by Kevin Eastman and Peter Laird. The core rulebook was first published by Palladium Books in September 1985 – a couple years before the Turtles franchise achieved mass popularity – and featured original comic strips and illustrations by Eastman and Laird. The rules and gameplay are based on Palladium's Megaversal system.

Characters 
Turtles and rats were not the only option for mutated animals; a rather large list was made available of animals that could be mutated in a wide variety of ways (intelligence, human looks, functioning hands, bipedalism, etc.). Some animals allowed access to different varieties (most notably dog breeds), and rules allowed for the creation of new animals. Characters had access to psionic powers and could come from a wide variety of sources (e.g., natural mutation or man-made experiments), as well as a variety of educational backgrounds.

The mutant animal player characters in the game lived in the modern world, functioning on the fringes of human society. One of the more innovative details of the game was the alignment system which used qualitative terms like "principled" and "miscreant" along with a list of diagnostic behaviors such as "would kill an innocent bystander" or "would never accept stolen property". These hypothetical behaviors pegged a character as fitting one of the particular alignment terms.

Campaign setting 
The original TMNT game partially mirrored the universe of the TMNT comic books and provided statistics for the Turtles, The Shredder, and other characters from early in the series. However, the adventures included with the book were completely independent of the TMNT universe, and brand-new characters were also introduced.

According to Kevin Siembieda, the 1987 television series and live-action movies, which made considerable changes to the Turtles' universe, had a severe negative impact on the popularity of the role-playing game. In an interview, Siembieda claimed that depictions of the Turtles in other media made them seem so childish that "no self-respecting teenager, even if he thought the Turtles were cool, or thought the Ninja Turtle game was cool, was going to be caught dead playing it. So our sales plummeted from 50,000 copies in a year to 12,000, and the next year that dropped to 6,000."

In January 1986, Teenage Mutant Ninja Turtles & Other Strangeness spawned a game with an alternate setting, that of a post-apocalyptic earth populated mainly with mutant animals and residual humans, called After the Bomb, which soon developed into a separate, though compatible game series.

Palladium announced that a second edition of the game would be released in the fall of 1997. However, due to the cost of maintaining the license as well as delayed production and low pre-orders for the proposed title, Palladium decided to end its license with Mirage Studios in January 2000. In 1998, a summary of the distinct rules outlining the basics of creating mutant characters and providing a short list of animal options, were incorporated into the second edition of Heroes Unlimited.

Years later, in a February 2007 interview, Siembieda hinted that Palladium might consider re-licensing the property depending on the performance of the CGI movie and other factors, but this prospect has not since been revisited.

Editions 
The original edition of Teenage Mutant Ninja Turtles & Other Strangeness was published with a section detailing a comprehensive list of mental illnesses ostensibly drawn from the Diagnostic and Statistical Manual of Mental Disorders. Players could either select a form of insanity as an optional step in character creation or randomly assign one during the course of gameplay as a result of their characters undergoing some kind of trauma, such as demonic possession, near-death experience, or torture. This section also featured an extensive list of sexual deviations which included pedophilia and homosexuality (in terms of the game, a traumatic event could potentially induce a character to convert from one sexual orientation to another), despite the latter having been officially declassified as a mental illness more than a decade before. After parents of younger players objected to the list of sexual deviations – which had previously appeared in the Palladium Role-Playing Game and Heroes Unlimited rulebooks – Palladium Books covered it with a plain white sticker. Subsequent printings removed the list of mental illnesses entirely, although occasional references to it remained elsewhere in the book.

Supplements 
Teenage Mutant Ninja Turtles Adventures (June 1986)
After the Bomb (game) (1986)
Teenage Mutant Ninja Turtles Guide to the Universe (May 1987)
Transdimensional Teenage Mutant Ninja Turtles (April 1989)
 Road Hogs (1989)
Truckin' Turtles (November 1989)
Turtles Go Hollywood (March 1990)

Reception
Marcus L. Rowland reviewed Teenage Mutant Ninja Turtles and Other Strangeness for White Dwarf #79, and stated that "the comics pretend to take themselves very seriously. To reflect this, the style of play is completely deadpan, setting intelligent and deadly animals against a background of urban terrorism, gang warfare, juvenile delinquency and random violence."

Teenage Mutant Ninja Turtles & Other Strangeness was reviewed in the "Open Box" column of White Dwarf Issue #83 (Nov., 1986), and Different Worlds #44 (Nov./Dec., 1986).

The game was also reviewed in the Dutch RPG magazine Magister Issue 30 - Sep 1991.

Teenage Mutant Ninja Turtles was ranked 36th in the 1996 reader poll of Arcane magazine to determine the 50 most popular roleplaying games of all time.  The UK magazine's editor Paul Pettengale commented: "The rules are badly laid out, but the principles are easy to learn and combat is fluid. So, fine on that score. It's a superbly fun game to play because of its quirkiness, and the fact that the post-apocalyptic setting has most of California under the ocean. Fantastic fun."

Reviews
 Casus Belli #37 (April 1987)
GamesMaster International Issue 1 - Aug 1990

References

External links 
Teenage Mutant Ninja Turtles official discussion board at Palladium Books Forums of the Megaverse
Teenage Mutant Ninja Turtles at RPG Geek Database
Teenage Mutant Ninja Turtles at RPGnet Game Index

 
1985 books
Other Strangeness
Megaverse (Palladium Books)
Comedy role-playing games
Furry role-playing games
Martial arts role-playing games
Superhero role-playing games
Role-playing games based on comics
Role-playing games introduced in 1985